"Golden Arrow " is popular song published both as an intermezzo two-step and a ballad in 1909. The music was composed by Egbert Van Alstyne, with lyrics added by Harry Williams. The ballad is a love story between the unnamed son of a Chief Arrow-Bow and a maiden named Golden Arrow, both of the Sioux nation in Idaho.

Lyrics
The lyrics as written by Williams:

References

Bibliography
Williams, Harry (w.); Van Alstyne, Egbert (m.). "Golden Arrow" (Sheet music). New York: Jerome H. Remick (1909).

External links
"Golden Arrow", Frank Stanley & Henry Burr (Indestructible Record 1128, 1909)—Cylinder Preservation and Digitization Project.

1909 songs
Songs with music by Egbert Van Alstyne
Songs with lyrics by Harry Williams (songwriter)